Jefferies is a surname. Notable people with the surname include:

 Alan Jefferies (born 1957), Australian writer
 Annalee Jefferies (born 1954), American actress
 Chris Jefferies (born 1980), American basketball player
 Cindy Jefferies, English writer of fiction for children
 Darren Jefferies (born 1993), English footballer
 Daulton Jefferies (born 1995), American baseball player
 Dinah Jefferies (born 1948), English writer
 Gregg Jefferies (born 1967), American baseball infielder
 Jim Jefferies (comedian) (born 1977), Australian comedian
 Jim Jefferies (footballer) (born 1950), Scottish football player and manager
 Jim Jeffries (baseball) (1893–1938), American baseball player
 Matt Jefferies (1921–2003), American artist, set designer and writer
 Richard Jefferies (1848–1887), English nature writer
 Thomas Jeffries, also known as Thomas Jefferies (died 1826), Australian outlaw & prisoner

See also
 Jefferies Financial Group, American financial services company
 Jefferys
 Jeffreys, surname
 Jeffries, surname

English-language surnames
Patronymic surnames
Surnames from given names